Phillipstown is a small inner suburb of the city of Christchurch, New Zealand. It lies south-east of the city centre being bordered by Cashel Street to the north, Aldwins Road to the east, Ferry Road to the south, and Fitzgerald Avenue to the west.

The Church of the Good Shepherd, a Category I heritage building registered by the New Zealand Historic Places Trust, was located in the suburb until its demolition after the 2011 Christchurch earthquake.

Demographics

Phillipstown had a population of 4,014 at the 2018 New Zealand census, an increase of 396 people (10.9%) since the 2013 census, and an increase of 699 people (21.1%) since the 2006 census. There were 1,668 households. There were 2,124 males and 1,893 females, giving a sex ratio of 1.12 males per female. The median age was 32.2 years (compared with 37.4 years nationally), with 621 people (15.5%) aged under 15 years, 1,206 (30.0%) aged 15 to 29, 1,869 (46.6%) aged 30 to 64, and 318 (7.9%) aged 65 or older.

Ethnicities were 61.8% European/Pākehā, 16.0% Māori, 8.2% Pacific peoples, 23.2% Asian, and 4.0% other ethnicities (totals add to more than 100% since people could identify with multiple ethnicities).

The proportion of people born overseas was 33.0%, compared with 27.1% nationally.

Although some people objected to giving their religion, 47.0% had no religion, 32.5% were Christian, 5.7% were Hindu, 1.5% were Muslim, 0.7% were Buddhist and 6.4% had other religions.

Of those at least 15 years old, 618 (18.2%) people had a bachelor or higher degree, and 678 (20.0%) people had no formal qualifications. The median income was $27,500, compared with $31,800 nationally. The employment status of those at least 15 was that 1,794 (52.9%) people were employed full-time, 432 (12.7%) were part-time, and 213 (6.3%) were unemployed.

Education
Phillipstown School was a full primary school which opened in 1877. It merged with Woolston School in 2015 to form Te Waka Unua School on the Woolston site.

References

 
Suburbs of Christchurch